Nemophora assamensis is a moth of the Adelidae family. It is found in India.

References

Moths described in 1997
Adelidae
Moths of Asia